Federal Route 264 (comprising Jalan Duyong–Ayer Keroh, Jalan Tun Hamzah (formerly part of Melaka State Route M107) and Jalan Gapam (formerly sections of Melaka State Route M12 between Ayer Keroh and Gapam side)) is a federal road in Melaka, Malaysia. It is a shortcut route to the North–South Expressway Southern Route via Ayer Keroh Interchange. The Kilometre Zero is located at Semabok.

Features
At most sections, the Federal Route 264 was built under the JKR R5 road standard, allowing maximum speed limit of up to 90 km/h.

List of junctions

References

264